Palacio de los Deportes de León, also known as Palacio Municipal de los Deportes de León is a Multi-use Indoor arena in León, Spain. Built in 1970, it has a seating capacity of 5,188 seats, and is currently the home venue for Baloncesto León basketball team and CB Ademar León handball team.

References

Leon
Handball venues in Spain
Indoor arenas in Spain
Sports venues completed in 1970
Sports venues in Castile and León
Sport in León, Spain